Samburu is a village located in Kwale County, Kenya.

Administratively, it is one of eight locations of Kwale Samburu division of Kwale County.

Transport 

It is served by a station on the national railway network.

Name 

Samburu subcounty should not be confused with Samburu County located elsewhere in Kenya, or Samburu National Reserve, located in that district.

Details 

 Altitude

See also 

 Railway stations in Kenya
 Altitude

References 

Populated places in Coast Province
Kwale County